"It's Only Love" is a song by Canadian singer and songwriter Bryan Adams, featuring American singer Tina Turner. Released as a single on October 21, 1985, the song was nominated for a Grammy Award for Best Rock Performance by a Duo or Group with Vocal and the accompanying video won an MTV Video Music Award for Best Stage Performance. It was the sixth and final single from Adams' album Reckless (1984) and was included on Tina Turner's live album Tina Live in Europe (1988), as well as being added to both artists' greatest hits compilations: Adams' Anthology (2005) and Turner's All the Best (2004). It reached number 15 in January 1986 on the Billboard Hot 100 in the United States and number 29 in the United Kingdom. The 12-inch single included the 1985 live version that would later appear on the album Tina Live in Europe (1988).

Adams told Songfacts that this was his most memorable collaboration of all the ones he has done. He explained: "Working with Tina Turner was amazing. I used to go to see her in the clubs when I was in my late teens/early 20s before she hit the big time. It was incredible to watch her." He added: "It was such a privilege to have sung with her, especially since I was only 24 at the time."

Music video
The video is a live clip from Tina Turner's 1985 Private Dancer Tour. It begins with Turner in her trademark black leather minidress and jean jacket, introducing the young Canadian Bryan Adams. He then joins her on stage for a live performance of the song. The popular video won Best Stage Performance in a Video at the 1986 MTV Awards.

It was the first music video ever to use Skycam.

Personnel 
 Bryan Adams – lead and backing vocals, rhythm guitar
 Tina Turner – lead and backing vocals
 Tommy Mandel – keyboards
 Keith Scott – lead guitar
 Dave Taylor – bass
 Mickey Curry – drums

Charts

Cover versions
H.E.R. and Keith Urban performed the song at the 2021 Rock and Roll Hall of Fame Induction Ceremony.

References

1985 songs
1986 singles
Bryan Adams songs
Tina Turner songs
Songs written by Jim Vallance
Songs written by Bryan Adams
A&M Records singles
Song recordings produced by Bob Clearmountain
Male–female vocal duets